Kastanas is a village of the Chalkidona municipality. Before the 2011 local government reform it was part of the municipality of Koufalia. The 2011 census recorded 630 inhabitants in the village. Kastanas is a part of the community of Prochoma.

History
The population of Kastanas consists mainly of Greek refugees from İzmit, but there are also smaller numbers of Sarakatsani and Greek refugees from Bulgaria. The village was formerly known as Kara Oglu (from ).

See also
 List of settlements in the Thessaloniki regional unit

References

Populated places in Thessaloniki (regional unit)